Gerlachov is a village and municipality in  Poprad District in the Prešov Region of northern Slovakia, under the High Tatras. It historically belongs to the Spiš region.

History
In historical records the village was first mentioned in 1326. The village was established by german gold miners, hence the two crossed hammers in the village's coat-of-arms, however, it isn't exactly known when it was established, probably around 1200. The name isn't of certain origin: it could stem from the then mayor of Spišská Sobota (now part of Poprad), Gerlach, or from a leader of colonizers, or from Geröll, a name for rough stones close to the stream Stará voda.

Geography
The municipality lies at an altitude of 791 metres and covers an area of 5.269 km². It has a population of about 804 people. The Gerlachovský štít peak is named after the village.

References

Part of the information in this article is based on its German equivalent

External links
Official website

Villages and municipalities in Poprad District